The 18th Avenue station is a local station on BMT West End Line of the New York City Subway in Bensonhurst, Brooklyn. It is served by the D train at all times. The station opened in 1916 as part of the BMT West End Line, which was upgraded into an elevated line as part of the Dual Contracts. Its platforms were extended to accommodate ten-car trains in the 1960s, and the station was renovated in 2012. The station is scheduled to become compliant with the Americans with Disabilities Act of 1990 through the installation of elevators.

History

Construction and opening
The 18th Avenue station opened on June 24, 1916, as the terminal of the first portion of the BMT West End Line, which extended from 36th Street on the BMT Fourth Avenue Line. The line was originally a surface excursion railway to Coney Island, called the Brooklyn, Bath and Coney Island Railroad, which was established in 1862, but did not reach Coney Island until 1864. Under the Dual Contracts of 1913, an elevated line was built over New Utrecht Avenue, 86th Street and Stillwell Avenue. The section of the West End Line between 62nd Street and this station originally opened with only one track in service. The second track between 62nd Street and 18th Avenue opened on July 8, 1916.

Renovations

In 2012, the station was rehabilitated with funding from the American Recovery and Reinvestment Act of 2009.

In 2019, the Metropolitan Transportation Authority announced that this station would become compliant with the Americans with Disabilities Act of 1990 through the installation of elevators as part of the agency's 2020–2024 Capital Program.

Station layout

This elevated station has three tracks and two side platforms. The center express track is not normally used. The station is situated in between two curves and the platforms have been extended to the north on both sides.

The 2012 artwork here is called Bensonhurst Gardens by Francesco Simeti. It features laminated glass windows on the platform windscreens, depicting imaginary flowery landscapes.

Exits
There is a single mezzanine with three stairs to the street (two to the northeast corner of 18th Avenue and 85th Street, and one to the southeast corner) as well as two to each platform.

In popular culture
Some exterior scenes of the 1991 Steven Seagal film Out for Justice were shot outside this station.

References

External links 
 
 Station Reporter — D Train
 18th Avenue entrance from Google Maps Street View
 Platforms from Google Maps Street View

BMT West End Line stations
New York City Subway stations in Brooklyn
Railway stations in the United States opened in 1916
1916 establishments in New York City
Bensonhurst, Brooklyn